Syria is a country in the Middle East, incorporating the northern Levant. 

Syria may also refer to:

Geography and history
Syria (region) refers to a wider historical geographic region. In this sense it can refer to:

In modern Middle East
 Arab Kingdom of Syria, a short-living Hashemite kingdom in 1920, installed after World War I and abolished by the French
 French Mandate for Syria and the Lebanon, incorporating the:
 State of Syria (1924–30), Mandatory proto-state, a progenitor of Mandatory Syrian Republic
 Syrian Republic (1930–58)
 Syrian Republic (1930–58)
 Syrian Arab Republic, a modern day UN member country
 Democratic Federation of Northern Syria, a self-proclaimed autonomous federation in Northern Syria
 Syrian opposition, a pseudo-state of the Syrian opposition as alternative to Ba'athist Syria
 Tahrir al-Sham Emirate
 Syrian areas occupied by the Islamic State of Iraq and the Levant
 Turkish occupation of northern Syria

Ancient and classic Near East
 Syro-Hittite states, during the Early Iron Age
 Coele-Syria, a province of the Seleucid Empire and the coastal Levantine province of the Roman Empire split from Syria Palaestina in the late 2nd century CE
 Roman Syria, a Roman province between 64 BCE and 135 CE
 Syria Palaestina, a Roman province between 135 CE and 390 CE
 Byzantine Syria, a sub-region within Byzantine Diocese of the East
 Syria Prima, a province of the Byzantine Empire, transformed from former Roman Syria
 Syria-Coele (Roman province), a province of the Byzantine Empire, transformed from former Roman Syria
 Bilad al-Sham, a province of the early Caliphates, corresponding to former Byzantine Syria
 Ottoman Syria, a geopolitical region of Levantine provinces of the Ottoman Empire
 Damascus Eyalet until 19th century
 Syria Vilayet after the Tanzimat reforms in 19th century

Incorporation of the geographic term Syria outside of the Middle East
 Little Syria, Manhattan, a neighborhood that existed in New York City, United States of America
 Șiria, a commune in Arad County, Romania
 Syria, Indiana, an unincorporated community in the United States
 Syria, Virginia, a town in the United States
 Syria Planum, a plateau in the Tharsis region of Mars

Art, entertainment, and media
 Syria (journal), an academic journal covering Semitic Middle East history
 Siria, a music duo
 Syria TV, national television channel of Syria

Other uses
 Syria (ship), sailing ship launched in 1868
 Syria (singer), the pseudonym of Cecilia Cipressi, an Italian singer-songwriter
 Greater Syria, either an Arab nationalistic term to define large parts of the Middle East or another name for the Syrian region

See also
 Name of Syria
 Syriac (disambiguation)
 Syriac language
 Syrian (disambiguation)
 Shaam (disambiguation)
 Sham (disambiguation)